Zira Stadium, also known as Zira Olympic Sport Complex Stadium  is a football stadium in Zirə, Azerbaijan.

References

Football venues in Azerbaijan
Zira FK